Shounter Lake is a scenic lake located in Shounter Valley, a sub valley of Neelam Valley, Azad Kashmir, Pakistan, at the elevation of . The lake is fed by the surrounding mountains glacial waters.
The lake is encircled by snow coated mountains, green grass vegetation and specimens of Iris hookeriana are dispersed around the lake. The lake is accessible from Kel town of Neelum Valley, by a jeepable track.

See also 
Ratti Gali Lake
Saral Lake
Mahodand Lake
Lulusar Lake
Chitta Katha Lake
List of lakes in Pakistan

References 

Lakes of Azad Kashmir